.
 

Tuggeranong is a former railway station, sometimes referred to as Tuggeranong Siding or Tuggeranong Platform, that was located on the now-disused Bombala railway line. 

It was named after 'Tuggeranong', an early sheep station in the area. Although its name shares the same origin as the Canberra suburban district of Tuggeranong, the former station site is further east, just over the border in New South Wales. The former station predates the suburban district by over eight decades, and it closed just over two years after the suburban district was inaugurated. 

The station's 'mileage' was originally 202 miles 71 chains (around 326.5 km), by rail from Sydney—via the older Picton-Mittagong route—but, at the time it closed, its 'mileage' was 335.629 km. It lies at the start of a large bend, in the railway line, known as the 'Horseshoe Bend', that skirts the Melrose Valley—formed by Dunn's Creek and its tributaries, and which is a part of the upper catchment of Tuggeranong Creek—as the line climbs toward Royalla. As a result, the railway line runs generally from south-west to north-east at this location. The station platform and its waiting room were on the northern side of the line.

The station building was described as "a weatherboard waiting-shed 30ft. x 15ft., with iron roof, built on pile foundations." The station platform was 264 feet long by 12 feet wide, and the siding 12 chains in length. The siding was a dead-end siding connected to the main line, at the 'up' end only, by a set of manually-operated double-ended points, with the points on the siding track acting as a catch point. There was also a level crossing of what is now Old Tuggeranong Road.

The platform and waiting room were not the only structures at the site. A photograph taken in 1920 shows several other small structures at the site, associated with the stock pens for the loading ramp and the railway fettlers that were stationed at Tuggeranong. A cottage for the railway ganger was removed in the 1950s. It seems that the loading ramp was modified to its final form, in mid-1950. 

Nearby, on the hill south-west of the station site, was a Travelling Stock Reserve, in recent years known as the Old Tuggeranong TSR—now Melrose Nature Reserve and part of Canberra Nature Park—into which livestock were herded before or after being carried by rail.

During its heyday, the station and its siding serviced the relatively low population that was associated with the grazing properties and small settlements of the Tuggeranong Valley. Its importance decreased with improvements in the area's roads—particularly the Monaro Highway—and road transport in general, from the 1930s and particularly after the 1950s. The station closed, in 1975, and was demolished. The railway closed in 1990, ending freight services.

The siding, points, and loading ramp still exist near the former site of the station. There is nothing left of the platform, station buildings, or other structures. Land on either side of the railway line, which was part of the original railway corridor, has been enclosed by fencing. That includes the land south of the line, which was formerly enclosed as stock pens for the loading ramp. The NSW-ACT border is therefore at the locked gate across the road, south of the railway line, not at the closest fence line to the railway tracks.

The area around the former station's site is part of a number of walking trails. Old Tuggeranong Road is closed to general public vehicular traffic.

Reference section

External links section

 NSW Railnet: Tuggeranong
Photograph of Tuggeranong station and siding in 1920
ACT Railway Border Walk

Bombala railway line
Railway stations in Australia opened in 1887
Disused railway stations in New South Wales
Disused regional railway stations in New South Wales